Juan Andrés Ramírez is a Uruguayan lawyer, and a Senator of the National Party.

Background

Juan Andrés Ramírez was born in Montevideo, Uruguay on 11 October 1947. He studied law at University of the Republic, becoming a well-known civil lawyer, and soon after became a member of the National Party. In the 1989 general elections, he was elected as a Senator of the Herrerismo faction of the National Party.

Interior Minister

President Luis Alberto Lacalle selected him as Interior Minister of his government, so Ramírez did not take up his Senator post. He was Interior Minister from March 1990 to November 1993, being replaced by Raúl Iturria.

1994 Presidential elections

Lacalle designated Ramírez as Herrerismo candidate for the 1994 presidential elections. Ramírez lost the elections within the National Party to Alberto Volonté, and the National Party narrowly lost to the Colorado Party.

Withdrawal from active politics

After 1999, Ramírez withdrew from active politics. A member of his faction, Alvaro Alonso, served as Employment Minister in Jorge Batlle's administration from 2000 to 2002. In 2004, he supported Jorge Larrañaga's successful bid for the National Party nomination.

Ramírez currently works as a lawyer in Montevideo.

References

See also
 Politics of Uruguay
 List of political families#Uruguay

1947 births
Living people
People from Montevideo
Interior ministers of Uruguay
Uruguayan people of Spanish descent
Candidates for President of Uruguay
University of the Republic (Uruguay) alumni
Academic staff of the University of the Republic (Uruguay)
20th-century Uruguayan lawyers
National Party (Uruguay) politicians